Víctor Peláez (born 12 February 1947) is an Ecuadorian footballer. He played in five matches for the Ecuador national football team from 1973 to 1975. He was also part of Ecuador's squad for the 1975 Copa América tournament.

References

1947 births
Living people
Ecuadorian footballers
Ecuador international footballers
Place of birth missing (living people)
Association football defenders
Barcelona S.C. footballers
Delfín S.C. managers